Albatrosh (established 2006 in Skien, Norway) is a Norwegian jazz duo performing their own musical compositions described as dense and dynamic.

Biography 
Albatrosh has played a series of concerts at home and abroad since its inception, including at festivals Vossajazz, Moldejazz, DølaJazz, Oslo Jazzfestival, Südtirol Jazz Festival, 12 Points! (Dublin), North Sea Jazz Festival and the London Jazz Festival.  The band members have distinguished themselves as key players on the young Norwegian jazz scene. Both have a background in jazz education at Trondheim Musikkonsevatorium (NTNU) and Norges Musikkhøgskole.

Personnel 
Eyolf Dale - piano
André Roligheten - saxophone

Honors 
 "JazZtipendiat" granted by Midtnorsk Jazzsenter, SMN SpareBank1 and Moldejazz 
 "Best Group" in «European Jazz Competition» 2009
 Albatrosh was in 2008 titled «Årets unge jazzmusikere» av Rikskonsertene and the Norwegian Jazz Federstion.
 Finalist in Young Nordic Jazz Comets in 2008, which was held in Copenhagen, Denmark 
 Soloist award in «Young Nordic Jazz Comets» 2008, awarded the saxophonist André Roligheten

Discography 
2009: Seagull Island (Inner Ear)
2010: Mystery Orchestra with Grenager & Tafjord  (Inner Ear)
2011: Yonkers (Rune Grammofon)
2014: Tree House with Trondheim Jazz Orchestra (MNJ Records)
2014: Night Owl (Rune Grammofon)

References

External links 

Norwegian jazz ensembles
Norwegian experimental musical groups
Musical groups established in 2006
Musical groups from Trondheim